Yumiko Ishiguro (born 31 October 1983) is a Japanese synchronized swimmer who competed in the 2008 Summer Olympics.

References

1983 births
Living people
Japanese synchronized swimmers
Olympic synchronized swimmers of Japan
Synchronized swimmers at the 2008 Summer Olympics
Aichi University of Education alumni
21st-century Japanese women